Otitoma lirata is a species of sea snail, a marine gastropod mollusk in the family Pseudomelatomidae, the turrids and allies.

Description
The length of the shell attains 35 mm, its diameter 12 mm.

The fusiform shell is turreted and keeled all over. The keels are nearly of the same size, and almost equidistant. The keel on the middle of the whorls is slightly the largest. The intermediate superfices are concave. The interstices between the keels are finely striate longitudinally. The sinus is deep. The siphonal canal is short. The color of the shell is white, the keels are spotted with reddish brown.

Distribution
This species occurs in the Pacific Ocean off Hawaii; also off the Philippines.

References

 Wiedrick S.G. (2014). Review of the genera Otitoma Jousseaume, 1880 and Thelecytharella with the description of two new species Gastropoda: Conoidea: Pseudomelatomidae) from the southwest Pacific Ocean. The Festivus. 46(3): 40–53

External links
  Tucker, J.K. 2004 Catalog of recent and fossil turrids (Mollusca: Gastropoda). Zootaxa 682:1–1295
 Gastropods.com : Pleurotoma lirata; accessed : 3 December 2010
 Kilburn R.N. (2004) The identities of Otitoma and Antimitra (Mollusca: Gastropoda: Conidae and Buccinidae). African Invertebrates, 45: 263–270

lirata
Gastropods described in 1845